Mohinder Singh Sarna (1923, Rawalpindi, Punjab, British India - 2001) was an Indian civil servant and novelist who wrote in the Punjabi language. He won the 1994 Sahitya Akademi Award for his short story collection Nawen Yug De Waris. He served as an officer of Indian Audit and Accounts Service from the 1950 batch and is the father of diplomat Navtej Sarna.

Books 
Naweṃ yugga de wārasa	
Aba jhūjana ko dāu : mahāṅkāwi	 
Aurata īmāna	 
Camakaura.	 
Dukh Bhanjan Tera Naam	 
Gāthā g̲h̲ama de māriāṃ dī	 
Inheritors of a new age
Katala pañjāṃ pạ̄ṇīāṃ dā : desha-waṇḍa dīāṃ kahāṇīāṃ	 
Kāliñgā.

Awards
Sarna won the Sahitya Akademi Award in 1994 for his book Nawen Yug De Waris (Short stories)

See also
List of Sahitya Akademi Award winners for Punjabi

References

People from Rawalpindi District
Punjabi people
Punjabi-language writers
Recipients of the Sahitya Akademi Award in Punjabi
1923 births
2001 deaths
20th-century Indian novelists
Novelists from Punjab, India